The Forum Boarium was the cattle forum venalium of ancient Rome.  It was located on a level piece of land near the Tiber between the Capitoline, the Palatine and Aventine hills.  As the site of the original docks of Rome (Portus Tiberinus), the Forum Boarium experienced intense commercial activity.

History
The Forum Boarium was the site of the first gladiatorial contest at Rome which took place in 264 BC as part of aristocratic funerary ritual—a munus or funeral gift for the dead. Marcus and Decimus Junius Brutus Scaeva put on a gladiatorial combat in honor of their deceased father with three pairs of gladiators.

The site was also a religious centre housing the Temple of Hercules Victor, the Temple of Portunus (Temple of Fortuna Virilis), and the massive 6th or 5th century BC Great Altar of Hercules.

In 215BC, four victims were buried alive by the Romans under the Forum Boarium as human sacrifices to placate the gods after a series of events were seen as portents to great disaster. In volume five  of Livy's History of Rome, which was written about 200 hundred years later, the Roman historian wrote: 
A Gaulish man and a Gaulish woman and a Greek man and a Greek woman were buried alive under the Forum Boarium. They were lowered into a stone vault, which had on a previous occasion also been polluted by human victims, a practice most repulsive to Roman feelings. When the gods were believed to be duly propitiated, M. Claudius Marcellus sent from Ostia 1500 men who had been enrolled for service with the fleet to garrison Rome.

Architecture

The Temple of Hercules Victor or Hercules Olivarius (Hercules the Olive Branch Bearear ), is a circular peristyle building dating from the 2nd century BC. It consists of a colonnade of Corinthian columns arranged in a concentric ring around the cylindrical cella, resting on a tuff foundation. These elements originally supported an architrave and roof which have disappeared. It is the earliest surviving marble building in Rome. For centuries, this was known as the Temple of Vesta.

The Temple of Portunus is a rectangular building built between 100 and 80 BC. It consists of a tetrastyle portico and cella mounted on a podium reached by a flight of steps. The four Ionic columns of the portico are free-standing, while the six columns on the long sides and four columns at the rear are engaged along the walls of the cella. It is built of tuff and travertine with a stucco surface. This temple was for centuries known as the Temple of Fortuna Virilis.

Sources claim the Forum was the site for placement of a statue by the sculptor Myron, which had been looted from Aegina. While the source mentions a cow, it may have been a statuary group of Theusus defeating the Minotaur, which was apt for a cattle market.

On the late period of the Western Roman Empire, the area became overtaken with shops. Both temples were deconsecrated and converted to Christian churches.

Across the street is the church of Santa Maria in Cosmedin, housing the Bocca della Verità.

Restoration

Beginning in the late 1990s, a partnership between the Soprintendenza speciale per i beni archeologici di Roma and World Monuments Fund resulted in the conservation of both temples in the Forum Boarium. The project also included new landscaping for the site. However, the Arch of Janus is still unrestored.

References

External links
Lacus Curtius: Forum Boarium
Virtual Tour and Pictures of Boarium Forum
 Forum Boarum, World Monuments Fund
Sequence

Boarium
 
Rome R. XII Ripa
Buildings and structures completed in the 5th century BC
Buildings and structures completed in the 2nd century BC